Marije Tolman (born 1976) is a Dutch illustrator of children's literature.

Career 

In 2010, she won the Gouden Penseel award together with her father Ronald Tolman for her illustrations in the book De boomhut. She also won the Vlag en Wimpel award in 2008 for her illustrations in the book Mejuffrouw Muis en haar heerlijke huis written by Elle van Lieshout and in 2018 for her illustrations in the book Voor papa written by Daan Remmerts de Vries.

In 2019, she won the Zilveren Penseel award for her illustrations in the book Vosje written by Edward van de Vendel.

Awards 

 2008: Vlag en Wimpel, Mejuffrouw Muis en haar heerlijke huis
 2010: Gouden Penseel, De boomhut (with Ronald Tolman)
 2018: Vlag en Wimpel, Voor papa
 2019: Zilveren Penseel, Vosje

References

External links 
 

1976 births
Living people
Dutch children's book illustrators
Dutch women illustrators
Dutch illustrators
Gouden Penseel winners